Ahmed Chagou is a Moroccan professional footballer, who plays as a defender.

International career
In January 2014, coach Hassan Benabicha, invited him to be a part of the Morocca squad for the 2014 African Nations Championship. He helped the team to top group B after drawing with Burkina Faso and Zimbabwe and defeating Uganda. The team was eliminated from the competition at the quarter final zone after losing to Nigeria.

References

External links
 Ahmed Chagou at Footballdatabase
 

1987 births
Living people
Moroccan footballers
Footballers from Casablanca
Morocco international footballers
Morocco A' international footballers
2014 African Nations Championship players
Difaâ Hassani El Jadidi players
Place of birth missing (living people)
Association football defenders
Raja CA players
Racing de Casablanca players
Ittihad Khemisset players
Kawkab Marrakech players